The Tale of Nokdu is a 2019 South Korean television series starring Jang Dong-yoon, Kim So-hyun, Kang Tae-oh, and Jung Joon-ho. It is based on the webtoon by Hye Jin-yang which was published in 2014 on Naver Webtoon. It aired on KBS2 from September 30 to November 25, 2019.

Synopsis
Set in the Joseon dynasty, the series is about a man who disguises as a woman to enter a mysterious women-only village in search of the truth about his birth; and a young woman who does not want to become a kisaeng in pursuit of revenge for her family.

Cast

Main
[[File:190930 KBS '조선로코 녹두전' 제작발표회 03.png|thumb|250px|Leads Jang, Kim, Jung and Kang at The Tale of Nokdu'''s press conference in September 2019.]]

 Jang Dong-yoon as Jeon Nok-du / Lady Kim Nok-soon / Yeon Soo
 Kim Ji-woo as young Jeon Nok-du
 A smart and athletic man who, due to an incident, enters an all-women village where men are strictly forbidden. To do so, he dresses himself as a woman in the guise of the widowed Lady Kim Nok-soon.
 Kim So-hyun as Dong Dong-joo / Yoo Eun-seo
 Jo Ye-rin as young Dong Dong-joo / Yoo Eun-seo
 A clumsy and hot-tempered kisaeng trainee who has no skills in performing arts, but is an artisan. Wanting to take revenge on the man who wronged her family, she uses her skills in developing a concealed weapon. 
 Kang Tae-oh as Prince Neungyang / Cha Yool-moo
 Jeon Jin-seo as young Prince Neungyang / Cha Yool-moo
 The king's nephew who seemingly lives a simple life. He is a man known for his looks and talent in cooking. He cherishes Dong-joo, having been betrothed to her before her family's disgrace. He stages a coup and becomes the next king of Joseon.
 Jung Joon-ho as King Gwanghae
 Upon the death of his father and after finding out that he was not the intended successor, he orders the execution of the supporters of his father's will. He jealously guards the throne against possible contenders.

Supporting
People around Jeon Nok-du
 Lee Seung-joon as Jung Yoon-jeo, Nok-du and Hwang-tae's father.
 Song Geon-hee as Jeon Hwang-tae/Jung Yi-hyun, Nok-du's older brother.
 Lee Moon-sik as Hwang Jang-gun, a martial art master and soon to be father-in-law of Nokdu.
 Go Geon-han as Yeon Geun, a rich man who manages the widow village and is entangled with Nok-du.
 Park Da-Yeon as Hwang Aeng-du, 7 years old daughter of Hwang Jang-gun. She is convinced that her father promised to marry her with Nokdu, so she called Nokdu "honey".

People around Cha Yool-moo
 Hwang In-youp as Park Dan-ho, Cha Yool-moo's escort warrior with an excellent sword skill. He is ambitious in sword-fighting and very loyal to Yool-moo, willing to even lay down his life if needed to protect him.
 Kim Yi-kyung as Ok-ran, a kisaeng who is jealous of Yool-moo's one-sided devotion towards Dong-joo.

People around King Gwanghae
 Kim Tae-woo as Heo Yoon, King Gwanghae's most beloved friend and subject.
 Lee Eun-hyung as officer Baek Jong, a man who is silently guarding the king.
 Park Min-jung as Deposed Queen Yu, King Gwanghae's queen consort.
 Oh Ha-nee as Queen Inmok, King Gwanghae's young stepmother or King Seonjo's wife.

Kisaengs
 Yoon Yoo-sun as Cheon Hae-soo, the head and guardian of the village to protect the kisaeng and the widow village.
 Lee Joo-bin as Mae Hwa-soo, a friend of Dong-joo and the most popular kisaeng with her talent and natural dancing ability.

Member of the Virtuous Women Corps (Yeollyeodan)
 Yoon Sa-bong as Kang Soon-nyeo
 Hwang Mi-young as Park Bok-nyeo
 Yoon Geum Sun Ah as Lee Mal-nyeon

Member of the Muwol Corps (Muwoldan)
 Cho Soo-hyang as Kim Ssook, a calm and cautious widow who has impressive sword skills.
 Song Chae-yoon as Min Deul-re, a mysterious person who is following Nok-du and the dandelion.
 Han Ga-rim as No Yeon Boon
 Yang So-min as Ahn Jeong-sook 

Others
 Han Da-sol as Hang-ah, a court lady who falls in love with Nok-du at first sight.
 Kwon Hyuk

Special appearances
 Park Chul-min as the father-in-law of the escaper and the holder of elephant treasure statue of Ming Dynasty. (Ep.1, 8) 
 Lee Ho-jae as the father who threw the stone at the king. (Ep.1)
 Jung Yi-rang as the inn owner. (Ep.1)

Production
 The first script reading was held in June 2019 at KBS Annex Broadcasting Station in Yeouido, Seoul, South Korea.
 Yeonwoo of Momoland was offered the role of Mae Hwa-soo, but declined due to health concerns.  
 The series was filmed in Dongmakgol, Pyeongchang-gun, Gangwon Province, South Korea from June 1 to August 31, 2019.
 The series suspended its production on July 4, 2019, in wake of actress Jeon Mi-seon's death. She was cast as Cheon Hae-soo.
 On July 18, 2019, it was revealed that lead actress Kim So-hyun suffered a minor injury when she fell off a horse while filming. Filming was canceled and rescheduled after her recovery.
 On August 26, 2019, The Tale of Nokdu, Naver Music and National Gugak Center announced the opening of K-Drama Music Competition Season 3 to select ten songs for the series' original soundtrack. The winner's song will be released as an official soundtrack on various music portals with the prize money of ₩2 million.
 It is the first series produced by Wavve and aired simultaneously on KBS2 and Wavve starting September 30.

Original soundtrack

Part 1

Part 2

Part 3

Part 4

Part 5

 Part 6 

 Part 7 

 Part 8 

 Part 9 

 Part 10 

Reception

The series had a strong opening week for KBS2 22:00 Monday/Tuesday timeslot with ratings ranging from 6-8% that was last achieved by Sweet Stranger and Me back in 2016. It was announced on October 2 that due to "The Tale of Nokdu effect", Wavve has increased 4.5 times in paid subscribers daily and peak-time traffic rose more than 30% due to service reorganization, wave marketing and monopoly contents after launching a month before the drama aired. In addition, the drama reached 8.8% of the total viewing time of domestic dramas provided by Wavve considering it provides both latest and old series.

Jang Dong-yoon saddled to a difficult task in transforming himself into a woman by growing out his hair and going on a severe diet to be able to pass as a woman in hanbok received praises from the viewers. He and Kim So-hyun were donned the nickname "Manhwa tearing" chemistry by the viewers for capturing everything from laughter to excitement and adding their own colors to the original characters.

According to the Content Power Index, The Tale of Nokdu was ranked second in both drama and non-drama and first in the drama category. In addition, according to the Good Data Corporation survey, the series was ranked third place in online video consumption of currently airing and upcoming dramas, and Jang Dong-yoon and Kim So-hyun were ranked third and fifth respectively in the list of top 10 most talked about actors and actresses in South Korea. As of 4th Week of November, the drama ended topped on the list of top 10 most talked about dramas.SeoulBeats gave the drama a positive review, saying: "...cannot be defined by a single genre. The ability of the drama to experiment with various genres at once is due in large part to the complex character motives, desires, and relationships that drive the plot." Although mild, The Tale of Nokdu indirectly demonstrates the great abilities of women from special bodyguards, female assassins to a community of widows. Moon Soo-yeon of The Fact praised Jang dong-yoon, Kim So-hyun and Kang Tae-oh's acting performance to the ever-changing atmosphere in a work where the elements of comic, melo, action, and traditional historical drama were properly harmonized. Sarah Kim, SVP of content and partnerships at Rakuten Viki stated that "It was good to have a cross-dressing drama, which has not been produced since Coffee Prince."The Tale of Nokdu ranked 15th on 2019 Wavve Chart. According to a survey conducted by SBS, the series ranked 5th among the Korean dramas in 2019.

Viewership

International broadcastThe Tale of Nokdu'' is available on online streaming services such as Viki, Kocowa, Viu, and Netflix.

Awards and nominations

Notes

References

External links

  
 
 
 Joseon Love Story: The Tale of Nokdu at Naver Webtoon 

Korean Broadcasting System television dramas
Korean-language television shows
2019 South Korean television series debuts
2019 South Korean television series endings
South Korean romantic comedy television series
Television shows based on South Korean webtoons
South Korean historical television series
Television series set in the Joseon dynasty
Cross-dressing in television
Television series by Monster Union
Wavve original programming